This is a list of episodes for Nagi-Asu: A Lull in the Sea, known in Japan as , a 2013–2014 Japanese anime television series produced by P.A. Works. The series centers on a group of seven friends: Hikari Sakishima, Manaka Mukaido, Chisaki Hiradaira, and Kaname Isaki, children from the sea; and Tsumugu Kihara, Miuna Shiodome, and Sayu Hisanuma, their new friends from the surface.

The anime series is produced by P.A. Works and directed by Toshiya Shinohara. The screenplay is written by Mari Okada and the original character designs are by Buriki. It started airing on October 3, 2013. For episode 14 to 25, the opening and ending themes are "Ebb and Flow" by Ray and "Mitsuba no Musubi me" by Nagi Yanagi respectively. The 26th and final episode has 2 insert songs: "lull ~Earth color of a calm~" and "mnemonic", sung by Ray and Yanagi, respectively. NIS America acquired the home video and streaming rights to the anime.


Episode list

References

Nagi-Asu: A Lull in the Sea